Little Hulton railway station served the village of Little Hulton, Greater Manchester, England.

History
The station was opened on 1 April 1875 by the London and North Western Railway (LNWR), on the line from Roe Green Junction to Bolton Great Moor Street. It was situated on the north side of the turnpiked Manchester to Chorley road at Little Hulton.

The LNWR proposed naming the station Streetgate but was  overruled by the Little Hulton Local Board.

The line and station closed to regular passenger traffic in 1954, with the last train calling on Saturday 27 March.

By 2015 the trackbed through the station site formed part of National Cycle Network Route 55.

References

Notes

Bibliography

External links
 The station on a 1948 OS map via npe maps
 The station on an 1888 series OS map overlay via National Library of Scotland
 The station and line via railwaycodes

Disused railway stations in Salford
Former London and North Western Railway stations
Railway stations in Great Britain opened in 1875
Railway stations in Great Britain closed in 1954